Anna Kellnerová (born 26 November 1996) is a Czech showjumper. She is twice Czech junior national champion and twice Czech national champion in the young riders category. She also competed at the 2021 Olympic games in Tokyo.

Family 
Anna Kellnerová is the daughter of Czech businessman Petr Kellner, the founder and major shareholder of PPF Group and the richest Czech.

Career 
Kellnerová started horse-riding at a young age and received her licence at the age of 12. Currently, Kellnerová is a member of the Czech Equestrian Team, teaming up with multiple Czech national champion, Aleš Opatrný.

In 2009, Kellnerová attended training with British coach Kenneth Clawson. In 2011, Marek Javorský became Kellnerová's coach, and since 2015, she has been coached by Jessica Kürten.

In 2012, Kellnerová won her first team junior national title with a horse called Zonny. In 2013, she won her first individual junior national title, with a horse called Curley Sue. This was followed by victories in the Czech National Championship in 2014 and 2015, this time in the Young Riders category, riding a horse called Bacara de la Ferme Blanche.

Since 2013, Kellnerová has regularly competed in the European Junior Championship in both the junior and senior categories. In 2014, she finished 31st, riding a horse called Kashmir. During the Furusyia Nations Cup in Budapest and Arezzo in 2014, she finished first and second with the Czech national team.

In 2015 and 2016, Kellnerová represented the Czech Republic at the Nations Cup and European Young Riders Championship in Millstreet, Ireland. In 2016 she finished second in the year-long ladder of the PAVO Equestrian Cup in the senior show jumping category. In March 2017, she was awarded ‘The Women Rider of 2016’ in the young riders’ category by the Czech Equestrian Federation. Along with Aleš Opatrný she is a member of the Berlin Lions team, and she has competed at the prestigious Global Champions League since 2017.

In 2018, Kellnerová continued to compete for the Prague Lions team at the Global Champions League series, along with her teammate Aleš Opatrný. The other members of the team are Niels Bruynseels, Holger Wulschner and Gerco Schröder and the team won the second round of the series in Miami. During this event Anna Kellnerová, along with her Dutch teammate Gerco Schröder, showcased a near perfect run.

References 

1996 births
Living people
Czech female equestrians
Show jumping riders
Sportspeople from Prague
Equestrians at the 2020 Summer Olympics
Olympic equestrians of the Czech Republic